Manganocene or bis(cyclopentadienyl)manganese(II) is an organomanganese compound with the formula [Mn(C5H5)2]n.  It is a thermochromic solid that degrades rapidly in air.  Although the compound is of little utility, it is often discussed as an example of a metallocene with ionic character.

Synthesis and structure
It may be prepared in the manner common for other metallocenes, i.e., by reaction of manganese(II) chloride with sodium cyclopentadienide:
 MnCl2  +  2 CpNa   →   Cp2Mn  +  2 NaCl

In the solid state below 159 °C, manganocene adopts a polymeric structure with every manganese atom coordinated by three cyclopentadienyl ligands, two of which are bridging ligands. Above 159 °C, the solid changes color from amber to pink and the polymer converts to the structure of a normal sandwich complex, i.e., the molecule Mn(η5-C5H5)2.

Reactions 
The ionic character of manganocene gives it an unusual pattern of reactivities compared to metallocenes of other transition metals in the same row. It is kinetically labile, being readily hydrolysed by water or hydrochloric acid, and readily forms adducts with two- or four-electron Lewis bases.

Manganocene polymerizes ethylene to high molecular weight linear polyethylene in the presence of methylaluminoxane or diethylaluminium chloride as cocatalysts. It does not polymerize propylene.

References

Metallocenes
Organomanganese compounds
Cyclopentadienyl complexes